Iron(II,III) sulfide is a blue-black (sometimes pinkish) chemical compound of iron and sulfur with formula Fe3S4 or FeS·Fe2S3, which is much similar to iron(II,III) oxide. It occurs naturally as the sulfide mineral greigite and is magnetic. It is a bio-mineral produced by and found in magnetotactic bacteria. It is a mixed valence compound, featuring both Fe2+ and Fe3+ centers, in 1:2 ratio.

Crystal structure
The crystallographic unit cell is cubic, with space group Fd3m. The S anions form a cubic close-packed lattice, and the Fe cations occupy both tetrahedral and octahedral sites.

Magnetic and electronic properties
Like the related oxide magnetite (Fe3O4), iron(II,III) sulfide is ferrimagnetic, with the spin magnetic moments of the  centers in the tetrahedral sites oriented in the opposite direction as those in the octahedral sites, and a net magnetization.  Both metal sites have high spin quantum numbers. The electronic structure of greigite is that of a half metal.

References

Further reading

Iron(II,III) compounds
Sulfides